The upper house of the Parliament of Rwanda is the Senate (Sena/Sénat). The Senate has 26 members elected or appointed for eight-year terms: 12 elected by provincial councils, eight appointed by the President of the Republic to ensure the representation of historically marginalized communities, four by the National Consultative Forum of Political Organizations, and two elected by the staff of the universities (one public, one private). Additionally, former presidents can request to become a member of the Senate.

The Senate was established in 2003.

Presidents

See also
 First legislature of the Rwandan Senate, 2003-2011
 Second legislature of the Rwandan Senate, 2011-2019
 Third legislature of the Rwandan Senate, 2019-2027

Sources

External links
 Official website Our Senate

Parliament of Rwanda
Government of Rwanda
Rwanda
2003 establishments in Rwanda